The 2001 Formula Nippon Championship was  contested over 10 rounds. 11 different teams, 23 different drivers, 2 different chassis and only 1 engine competed.

Teams and drivers

Calendar
All races were held in Japan.

Note:

Race 8 originally fastest lap set by Juichi Wakisaka, but he was disqualified.

Championship standings

Drivers' Championship
Scoring system

Teams' Championship

External links
2001 Japanese Championship Formula Nippon

Formula Nippon
Super Formula
Nippon